The rugosa, also called the tetracorallia or horn coral, are an extinct order of solitary and colonial corals that were abundant in Middle Ordovician to Late Permian seas.

Solitary rugosans (e.g., Caninia, Lophophyllidium, Neozaphrentis, Streptelasma) are often referred to as horn corals because of a unique horn-shaped chamber with a wrinkled, or rugose, wall. Some solitary rugosans reached nearly a meter in length. However, some species of rugose corals could form large colonies (e.g., Lithostrotion). When radiating septa were present, they were usually in multiples of four, hence Tetracoralla in contrast to modern Hexacoralla, colonial polyps generally with sixfold symmetry.

Rugose corals have a skeleton made of calcite that is often fossilized. Like modern corals (Scleractinia), rugose corals were invariably benthic, living on the sea floor or in a reef-framework. Some symbiotic rugose corals were endobionts of Stromatoporoidea, especially in the Silurian period. Although there is no direct proof, it is inferred that these Palaeozoic corals possessed stinging cells to capture prey. They also had tentacles to help them catch prey. Technically they were carnivores, but prey-size was so small they are often referred to as microcarnivores.

Morphology 

Rugose corals always show tabulae, horizontal plates that divide the corallite skeleton. The corallites are usually large relative to different types of coral. Rugose corals will sometimes have dissepiments, which are curved plates connected to septa and tabulae. The symmetry can be distinguished by the orientation of septa in a transverse section of the coral. Rugose corals always display bilateral symmetry whereas tabulate and scleractinian corals show radial symmetry. Initially there are only 4 major septa; later minor septa are added in the 4 resulting spaces. The complex arrangement of septa is diagnostic of rugose corals. Rugose corals will also always have a columella, an axial rod which supports the septa running up the center of the corallite. It is present in rugose corals because they were mainly solitary and so required the extra support. Tabulate corals have no columella because they were always colonial and relied on the support of neighboring corallites.

References 

 
Lopingian extinctions
Ordovician first appearances